This article presents a list of the historical events and publications of Australian literature during 1912.

Books 

 Mary Grant Bruce — Timothy in Bushland
 James Francis Dwyer — The White Waterfall
 May Gibbs — About Us
 Gertrude Hart — The Dream Girl
 Fergus Hume
 The Mystery Queen
 A Son of Perdition: An Occult Romance
 Dorothea Mackellar & Ruth M. Bedford — The Little Blue Devil
 Ambrose Pratt — A Daughter of the Bush
 Steele Rudd — The Old Homestead
 Lindsay Russell — Smouldering Fires 
 Patricia Lindsay Russell — Love Letters of a Priest 
 Thomas Edward Spencer — Bindawalla: An Australian Story
 Lilian Turner — Written Down

Poetry 

 Louis Esson — Red Gums and Other Verses
 G. Herbert Gibson — Ironbark Splinters from the Australian Bush
 Adam Lindsay Gordon — The Poems of Adam Lindsay Gordon
 Sydney Jephcott — Penetralia
 Norman Lindsay — Norman Lindsay's Book: No. 1
 Hugh McCrae — "Earth"
 John Shaw Neilson
 "Honeythirst"
 "The Lover Sings"
 "The Petticoat Plays"
 Bernard O'Dowd — The Bush
 Charles Henry Souter — Irish Lords and Other Verses

Drama

 Louis Esson – The Time is Not Yet Ripe

Non-Fiction

 Ethel Turner — Ports and Happy Havens

Births 

A list, ordered by date of birth (and, if the date is either unspecified or repeated, ordered alphabetically by surname) of births in 1912 of Australian literary figures, authors of written works or literature-related individuals follows, including year of death.

 12 March — Kylie Tennant, novelist (died 1988)
 28 March — A. Bertram Chandler, science fiction writer (died 1984)
 2 April — Barbara Giles, poet (died 2006)
 28 May — Patrick White, novelist (died 1990)
 12 June — Roland Robinson, poet (died 1992)
 20 July — George Johnston, novelist (died 1970)
 16 September — John Jefferson Bray, poet (died 1995)

Deaths 

A list, ordered by date of death (and, if the date is either unspecified or repeated, ordered alphabetically by surname) of deaths in 1912 of Australian literary figures, authors of written works or literature-related individuals follows, including year of birth.

 5 April — Robert Dudley Adams, poet (born 1829)
 13 September — Joseph Furphy, novelist (born 1843)

See also 
 1912 in literature
 1912 in poetry
 List of years in literature

References

Literature
Australian literature by year
20th-century Australian literature